was a Japanese diplomat.

He entered the Japanese Ministry of Foreign Affairs in 1929. In 1953-1955 served as Ambassador to the Philippines, and as Vice Minister of Foreign Affairs in 1957–1958. He served as Ambassador to the United Kingdom in 1958–1964.

See also
 List of Japanese ministers, envoys and ambassadors to Germany

References 

1905 births
2006 deaths
Japanese centenarians
Men centenarians
Ambassadors of Japan to the United Kingdom
Ambassadors of Japan to the Philippines